Parvarish is a 1977 Hindi-language crime drama film directed by Manmohan Desai. The film stars Amitabh Bachchan and Vinod Khanna as two brothers playing oneupmanship, because one brother believes he is adopted and not the real son. Shabana Azmi and Neetu Singh play the love interests. Amjad Khan and Kader Khan are the villains. Laxmikant Pyarelal gave the music to this film and Majrooh Sultanpuri the lyrics.

Parvarish is one of the biggest Diwali blockbuster of all time  and the fourth highest-grossing film of the year at the Box office; and Manmohan Desai's one of four hits that year, the others being Dharam Veer and Chacha Bhatija with Dharmendra and Amar Akbar Anthony, a blockbuster with Amitabh Bachchan, Vinod Khanna and Rishi Kapoor. The film also marked Shammi Kapoor's full entry into character roles (after his own production Manoranjan), which he would lead in for nearly the next two decades.

Plot
DSP Shamsher Singh (Shammi Kapoor) captures the notorious bandit Mangal Singh (Amjad Khan) just as Mangal's wife is about to give birth. She dies at childbirth, but not before extracting from the DSP his promise to take care of her son. Subsequently, DSP Singh raises the boy alongside his own. Ironically, DSP Singh's own biological son Kishen has a wicked streak, while Mangal's son, Amit, is endowed with a sweet, honest nature. Released after 14 years in jail, Mangal finds out that his old enemy is raising his son, who he believes to be Kishen. After a misunderstanding, Kishen comes to believe that he is actually Mangal's son and falls under the bandit's influence, though he continues to live in the inspector's home.

20 years later, Amit (Amitabh Bachchan) is a police inspector, while Kishen (Vinod Khanna) is a teacher for blind children, while simultaneously working as a smuggler for a now-affluent Mangal's gang.

Amit and Kishen encounter a plucky pair of pickpocketing orphaned sisters – Neetu (Neetu Singh) and Shabbo (Shabana Azmi) – who are smitten with the brothers and half-heartedly resolve to go straight in order to win them over. Amit, assigned to take down Mangal's gang, eventually encounters Kishen in an altercation that ends with the latter getting shot in the leg. Amit tries to expose Kishen during Shamsher's birthday party, but Kishen tricks his way out of the situation. Later, Kishen's car is rigged with a time bomb by a foe of his. Amit saves Kishen, who was smuggling diamonds at the time, but gets caught in the explosion himself; upon gaining consciousness, Amit reveals that he can no longer see.

Kishen, feeling indebted, tries to help Amit cope. Amit, who can actually see, uses this opportunity to gain damning evidence of Kishen's crimes. Shamsher's wife Asha finds out that Amit can see, forcing Amit to tell her the truth about Kishen. A devastated Asha ends up revealing Amit's true parentage. Meanwhile, Neetu and Shabbo try to kill Mangal Singh, who had killed their parents years ago. Mangal captures them, and notices that Neetu has a distinct locket. This locket, given by Amit to Neetu, had previously been given by Mangal to his wife with the intention to pass it on to their son; Mangal thus realizes that Amit is his son.

Shamsher finally confronts Kishen, who is told about his true parentage, as well. Kishen, guilty, repents by leading Amit to Mangal's lair. Mangal holds Neetu and Shabbo hostage and tries to kill Kishen. Amit defeats Mangal's brother Dev in a fight, while Kishen rescues the women. Mangal, having escaped, reports to his boss Supremo, who captures Shamsher. Amit and Kishen team to rescue their father and capture Supremo, leading to an underwater action scene. Mangal finally surrenders to Amit, while Kishen surrenders to Shamsher.

The film ends with Amit and Kishen (having served his sentence) getting married to Neetu and Shabbo.

Cast
 Shammi Kapoor as D.S.P.  Shamsher Singh
 Amitabh Bachchan as Inspector Amit Singh
 Vinod Khanna as Kishan Singh
 Neetu Singh as Neetu Singh
 Shabana Azmi as Shabbo Singh
 Kader Khan as Supremo
 Amjad Khan as Mangal Singh
 Dev Kumar as Dev Singh, Mangal Singh's brother
 Indrani Mukherjee as Asha Singh (Shamsher's wife)
 Heena Kauser as Mangal Singh's wife
 Chand Usmani as Radha (Neetu and Shabbo's mother)
 Ram Sethi as Neetu and Shabbo's father
 Tom Alter as Jackson, Supremo's 2nd-in-command
 Sopariwala as a guest of Shamsher Singh

Crew
 Art Direction: Babu Rao T. Poddar
 Costume Design: Shalini Shah, Ram Singh
 Assistant director: Denny Desai, Ketan Desai
 Choreographer: Kamal Kumar

Music
The film had music by Laxmikant Pyarelal and lyrics by Majrooh Sultanpuri.

References

External links
 

1977 films
1977 crime drama films
Indian crime drama films
Films set in Mumbai
1970s Hindi-language films
Films directed by Manmohan Desai
Films scored by Laxmikant–Pyarelal